A canal is a human-made channel for water.

Canal may also refer to:

People
(Alphabetical by surname)
 David Canal (born 1978), Spanish sprinter
 Esteban Canal (1896-1981), Peruvian chess player
 Giovanni Antonio Canal (1697–1768), Venetian painter, better known as Canaletto
 Richard Canal (born 1953), French science fiction writer
 B. de Canals, was a 14th-century Spanish author of a Latin chronicle
 María Antònia Canals (1930–2022), Spanish mathematician
 Agustín de la Canal (born 1980), Argentine football player
 Ramón Alva de la Canal (1892–1985), Mexican painter

Places
 Canal Flats, British Columbia, a village in British Columbia, Canada
 Canal Fulton, Ohio, United States
 Canal Street (disambiguation), name of numerous roads and neighborhoods
 Canal Township, Venango County, Pennsylvania, United States
 Canal Winchester, Ohio, United States
 Canals, Tarn-et-Garonne, a commune in the Tarn-et-Garonne department, France
 Canals, Valencia, a municipality in the province of Valencia, Valencian Community, Spain
 Petit-Canal, a commune in the department of Guadeloupe, France
 Canal San Bovo, municipality in Trentino in the northern Italian Region Trentino-Alto Adige/Südtirol
 Canal station (CTA Metropolitan Main Line)
 Canal station, a Lake Street Elevated station

Fjords
Behm Canal, U.S. state of Alaska
Gardner Canal, British Columbia, Canada
Hood Canal, U.S. state of Washington
Lynn Canal, U.S. state of Alaska
Pearse Canal, part of the Canada-United States border at Alaska
Portland Canal, British Columbia, Canada

Arts, entertainment, and media

Films
 The Canal (1979 film), a 1979 Turkish film
 The Canal (2014 film), a 2014 Irish film

Television
 Canal 13 (disambiguation), several television stations in the Americas
 Canal Digital, a pay TV and Internet service provider in Norway and Sweden
 Canal+ (Spanish satellite broadcasting company), a satellite television broadcasting company in Spain
 Canal+, a French premium pay television channel
 Canal+ 1, a Spanish commercial television channel
 Canal+ Group, a French film and television studio
 Canal+ Poland, a television network in Poland

Music
 "Canal", a song by the American band Bright from their self-titled album

Biology and healthcare
 Canal (anatomy), numerous structures that connect parts of the human body
 Ear canal, a tube running from the outer ear to the middle ear
 Knallgas, sometimes misspelt as "canal gas" or "canalgas," a term used in microbial metabolism
 Siphonal canal, an extension of the aperture in gastropod molluscs
 Root canal, a term in dentistry

Other uses
Canal (garden history) shorter canals in formal gardens, mostly of the 16-18th centuries
 Martian canals, a 19th and early 20th century belief that canals exist on Mars

See also
Calanque, a steep-walled inlet, cove, or bay
Channel (disambiguation)
El Cañal (disambiguation)
Lists of canals